Monsul is a Portuguese Freguesia  in the municipality of Póvoa de Lanhoso, it has an area of  and 773 inhabitants (2011).

Population

References 

Freguesias of Póvoa de Lanhoso